Maha Prasthanam is a Telugu-language anthology of poems written by noted literary writer Srirangam Srinivasarao. It is considered an epic and magnum opus in modern Indian poetry.  The work is a compilation of poetry written between 1930 and 1940. When it was published in 1950, it rocked the Telugu literary world. Maha Prasthanam meaning The Great Journey to a New World was also made into an Indian movie by the same name. The book was reprinted for the 31st time in 2010.

Poems in Mahaprasthanam
1. మహాప్ర
స్థానం(Mahaaprasthaanam)

2. జయభేరి (JayabhEri)

3. ఒకరాత్రి (Okaraatri)

4. గంటలు (Gantalu)

5. ఆకాశ దీపం (Aakaasa deepam)

6. రుక్కులు (Rukkulu)

7. అవతారం (Avataaram)

8. బాటసారి (Baatasaari)

9. ఆశాదూతలు (Aasaaduutalu)

10. ai

11. శైశవగీతి (Saisavagiiti)

12. అవతలిగట్టు (Avataligattu)

13. సాహసి (Saahasi)

14. కళారవి (Kalaaravi)

15. bikshuvarshiyasi

16. ఒక క్షణం (Oka kshanamlo)

17. పరాజితులు (Paraajitulu)

18. aa:

19. ఉన్మాది (Unmaadi)

20. svin barn kaviki

21. అద్వైతం (Advaitam)

22. వాడు (vaadu)

23. అభ్యుదయం (abhyudayam)

24. వ్యత్యాసం (vyatyaasam)

25. midhyaavaadi

26. pratij~n

27. chedupaata

28. కవితా ఓ కవితా (kaveetaa! o kaveetaa)

29. నవకవిత (navakavitha)

30. దేశ చరిత్రలు (DeSa Charitralu)

31. జ్వాలా తోరణం (jvaalaa toranam)

32. మానవుడా (maanavudA)

33. సంధ్య సమస్యలు (samdhyaa samasyalu)

34. దేని కొరకు (deni koraku)

35. కేక (keka)

36. Pedulu 

37. Garjinchu rashyaa

38. Nijamgaane

39. Needalu

40. Jagannaadhuni Radha Chakraalu

Honour
Sri Sri garnered the honoured title of Mahakavi (The Great Poet) after writing this epic.

References

Telugu-language literature
Telugu language
Audio of Mahaprasthanam by the poet himself!!

https://www.youtube.com/watch?v=A2M5fqXma5I&t=1159s

Mahaprasthanam https://www.youtube.com/watch?v=A2M5fqXma5I&t=1159s